Dim Seqerlu (also Romanized as Dīm Seqerlū; also known as Dīm Segherlū) is a village in Rezaqoli-ye Qeshlaq Rural District, in the Central District of Nir County, Ardabil Province, Iran. At the 2006 census, its population was 126, in 29 families.

References 

Towns and villages in Nir County